Big Red Racing is a racing video game released for MS-DOS in 1995. It was developed by Big Red Software and published by Domark. Versions were planned for Nintendo 64, PlayStation, Saturn, 3DO, and Jaguar but were not released.

Gameplay

Big Red Racing is a comedic racing game. During races, the commentators make humorous comments, stereotypically themed to the country they are from.  When menu items are clicked, humorous phrases are played.

There are 24 courses and 6 cups, encompassing the globe, the Moon, Venus, and Mars. Each course has a humorous subtitle, usually a parody of a famous phrase or film.

Customisation
For the driver, the player can choose from a few different body shapes and change the colour of the clothes. For the vehicle, the player can change the colour and decal.

Development
The later Eurogamer writer Keith Stuart was commissioned to write an expansive backstory for the game, which was to be included in the printed manual. But a few months before release the publisher balked at the cost and cut the manual. Looking back in 2016, Stuart wrote: "They were right. It didn't really add anything, it was indulgent (...) No one will ever care that I spent several weeks writing that nonsense or that now it is gone forever."

Reception

GameSpot said for the PC, "A racing sim it's not, but arcade fans should get a real kick out of it." A Next Generation critic highly praised the variety of playable vehicles and tracks and the use of real time graphics. He remarked that while the low graphical detail makes the game look chunky, it also enables the game to run just as smoothly with six players as with only one. However, he criticized the single-player mode for the AI's apparent cheating, since there is always one racer just slightly ahead of the player car, and recommended that consumers not buy the game until they've made certain they have someone who will play it with them. Frank Snyder of Computer Game Review offered Big Red Racing a positive score, writing, "I guarantee you'll be pleasantly surprised in the end."

References

1995 video games
Cancelled 3DO Interactive Multiplayer games
Cancelled Atari Jaguar games
Cancelled Nintendo 64 games
Cancelled PlayStation (console) games
Cancelled Sega Saturn games
Domark games
DOS games
DOS-only games
Europe-exclusive video games
Racing video games
Racing video games set in the United States
Sports video games set in Italy
Video games set on Venus
Video games set in Africa
Video games set in Australia
Video games set in the Arctic
Video games set in England
Video games set in China
Video games set in Egypt
Video games set in Europe
Video games set in France
Video games set in Germany
Video games set in Hawaii
Video games set in India
Video games set in Japan
Video games set in Mexico
Video games set in Norway
Video games set in Russia
Video games set in Scotland
Video games set in South America
Video games set on Mars
Video games set on the Moon
Multiplayer and single-player video games
Video games developed in the United Kingdom
Big Red Software games